N'Guessan Wilfried Kisito Yessoh (born 12 March 1992) is an Ivorian footballer who plays as a forward for Girabola club G.D. Interclube.

References

External links
 

1992 births
Living people
Ivorian footballers
Ivorian expatriate footballers
Association football forwards
AS Denguélé players
Al Ahli SC (Doha) players
Muaither SC players
Qatar Stars League players
Ivorian expatriate sportspeople in Qatar
Expatriate footballers in Qatar
Ligue 1 (Ivory Coast) players